Debutante Island is a narrow island which is the southernmost of the Søstrene Islands. The island is ice-covered except for a small rock outcrop and barely protrudes above the general level of the Publications Ice Shelf. It was mapped by Norwegian cartographers from aerial photographs taken by the Lars Christensen Expedition, 1936–37, and was named "Debutante" in 1952 by John H. Roscoe because the island is just beginning to "come out" from under its ice cover.

See also 
 List of antarctic and sub-antarctic islands

References

Islands of Princess Elizabeth Land